The Gloucestershire County Football Association, also simply known as the Gloucestershire FA or GFA, is the governing body of football in the county of Gloucestershire.  It was formed in 1886.

History

The Gloucestershire County Football Association has developed from small beginnings in 1886 into an Association of more than 2000 affiliated teams and 20 affiliated Leagues. Key dates in the history of the Association are provided below:

1886: At a meeting in the Full Moon Hotel, Stokes Croft, Bristol on 7 September, the Gloucestershire Football Association was formed to be administered by a Management Committee. Gloucestershire’s first President was the famous cricketer Dr W.G. Grace who was also an active Referee.

1889–90: 33 Clubs had affiliated to the County, which enabled a delegate to be sent to the Football Association.

1892: The Association was running two Cup Competitions and playing five or six County matches a season with the first League commencing operations.

1898: The Association's Management Committee became the Council with representatives from 15 Clubs and a representative from each League affiliated to the Association.

1919–20: A major change in the structure of the Council occurred when Northern Council was formed from areas north of Thornbury. However all decisions still had to be sanctioned by the full Council.

1927: The County Minor (Youth) Association was formulated.

1933: The responsibilities of the County Minor Association were assumed by the Main Council.

1946: The County Youth Association was revived following its demise in 1933.

1967: Moves were made to form an entirely separate Council in the North.  But at a meeting in December it was agreed that two separate Associations were impractical.  The immediate result was that a joint annual meeting was introduced in addition to the A.G.M.

1976: The last independent North and South Council meetings took place and in 1977 the Council again became a unified body.

1995: Following the sudden death of the long serving Hon. Secretary E J Marsh, the County appointed Paul Britton as full- time Secretary and shortly afterwards purchased the property at Oaklands Park, Almondsbury as its first permanent Headquarters.

1999: The County took the significant step of becoming a Limited Company becoming known as Gloucestershire Football Association Ltd.

2000: The development of Oaklands Park that included the addition of a Floodlit All-Weather Pitch and new Dressing Rooms was completed.  These facilities are now being extensively used for training groups from local junior clubs and disabled organisations.

2001: The development of the All-Weather Pitch and Dressing Rooms released capacity within the original building for the development of office space, a Board Room and Council Chamber.

2002: The County Youth Association ceased to be a semi- autonomous Association when it was incorporated into the main Association as the Youth Committee.

2006: David Neale was appointed Chief Executive following the death of Paul Britton in December 2005.

Oaklands Park

Oaklands Park was purchased by the Gloucestershire Football Association (GFA) for their new headquarters in 1994 after the existing owners Almondsbury Town FC was regretfully placed in the hands of the liquidator following a period of financial difficulties. Almondsbury Town FC became tenants at Oaklands Park in 1995 until May 2010, and in addition to using the pitch, the club were able to rent half of the building as a bar and skittle alley.

By 2009 the GFA established that they needed to take over this area for our their own use in order to cater for the increasing number of people employed by the Association in developing grassroots football. In addition to accommodating their staff, the GFA also needed training facilities to assist the development of clubs, coaches and referees.

The situation has eventually led to the demise of Almondsbury Town FC who in April 2011 announced that they were withdrawing from Zamaretto League's 2011–12 season and disbanding the first team citing failure to find a ground share as the main cause. In response the GFA released a statement advising that it was Almondsbury Town's decision to leave Oaklands Park, originally in April 2010, that prompted them to find new tenants and that an agreement had been struck with Winterbourne United and Roman Glass St George in October of that same year.

The situation has resulted in damaging publicity for the GFA in the local press. The Association have reiterated that their "main purpose as an organisation is to drive increased participation in football. As a direct result of the Oaklands Park refurbishment programme, (they) were able to host a team of four FA Tesco Skills Coaches".  The GFA expressed disappointment that the club were unsuccessful in their discussions with other parties.

Affiliated Leagues

Men's Saturday Leagues
Gloucestershire County League (1968)
Bristol & Avon League (1910)
Bristol & District League (1892)
Bristol & Suburban League (1894)
Bristol Churches League (1992)
Bristol Downs League (1905)
Bristol Premier Combination League (1957)
Cheltenham League (1899)
Cirencester & District League (1921)
Cotswold Churches League (2007)
Gloucestershire Northern Senior League (1922)
North Gloucestershire League (1907)
Stroud & District League (1902)
West Dean Charity League (1966)

Men's Sunday Leagues
Bristol & District Sunday League (1966)
Bristol & Wessex Sunday League (1980)
Bristol Regional League (Sunday) (1963)
Cheltenham Sunday League (1968)
Gloucester & District Sunday League (1965)

Ladies & Girls Leagues
Gloucestershire County Women's League (1998)
Gloucester County Girls League (2000)
Bristol Girls League (2001)

Youth Leagues
Gloucestershire County Youth League (1985)
Avon Youth League (1981)
Hanham Minor League (1978)
Bristol (U18) Football Combination League (1995)
Bristol Saturday Youth League (2008)
Cheltenham Youth League (1998)
Cotswold Youth League (2005)
Gloucester Youth League (1946-2016)
Mid Gloucester Mini-Soccer League (1996)
Severn Valley Youth League (2016)
Stroud & District Youth League (1947-2016)

Small Sided Leagues

‘Active 5aside’ – Adult Indoor Football
League South Gloucestershire
- Bradley Stoke
- Kingswood
- Thornbury
- Yate
Champion Soccer
- Cheltenham

Clifton College Sports Club
Summer 8-a-side League
Goals – Bristol North
Goals – Bristol South
Pitch Invasion 5-a-side
- Bristol
- Cheltenham
- Gloucester

- Stroud
Prostar Leagues
- Bristol – Ashton Park
- Bristol – Horfield
- Bristol – St George
- Gloucester
- Stroud
- Tewkesbury

Futsal Leagues
BristolFutsal.com League
- Hanham
Onside & Aspire Adult Futsal League
- Gloucester

Other Leagues
Bristol Casuals League (Veterans)
Gloucestershire & Somerset FA Ability Counts County League (2009)

Disbanded or Amalgamated Leagues

A number of leagues that were affiliated to the Gloucestershire FA have disbanded or amalgamated including:

Bristol Avon League (not to be confused with Bristol & Avon League)
Bristol Church of England League (now known as Bristol & Avon League)
Bristol Regional League (Saturday Competition)
Bristol Wednesday League
Dursley and District League
Dursley and Wotton League
Gloucester and District League
Iron Acton and District League
Forest of Dean League
Mid Gloucestershire League
Wotton and District League

Affiliated Member Clubs

Among the notable clubs that are affiliated to the Gloucestershire FA are:

Almondsbury UWE
Almondsbury Town
Bishop's Cleeve
Bitton
Brimscombe & Thrupp
Bristol City
Bristol Manor Farm
Bristol Rovers
Cadbury Heath
Cheltenham Saracens
Cheltenham Town

Cinderford Town
Cirencester Town
Fairford Town
Fintan FC
Forest Green Rovers
Gloucester City
Hardwicke
Hallen
Harrow Hill
Longwell Green Sports
Lydney Town
Mangotsfield United

Newent Town
Oldland Abbotonians
Quedgeley Wanderers 
Roman Glass St George
Shortwood United
Slimbridge
Stonehouse Town
Tuffley Rovers
Tytherington Rocks
Winchcombe Town
Winterbourne United
Yate Town

Lists of Gloucestershire FA cup and trophy winners

Gloucestershire Senior Professional Cup

The Senior Professional Cup, initially known as the Challenge Cup and later as the Senior Challenge Cup, was held 99 times between 1888 and 1996. Founded in 1887, it was originally a knockout tournament for all teams affiliated to the Gloucestershire County Football Association, but after a few years became dominated by Bristol City and Bristol Rovers to such an extent that the format of the competition was changed in 1907 to be an annual match between those two clubs. A list of the winners is shown in the table below.

Challenge Trophy

 Source

Senior Amateur Challenge Cup (South)

 Sources

Senior Amateur Challenge Cup (North)

 Source

Lower tier County Cup (South)

Sources

Lower tier County Cup (North)

Sources

Women's competitions

Directors & Officials

Board of Directors
Roy Schafer (Chairman)
Graham Papworth (Finance Director)
David Neale (Chief Executive)
Sue Henson-Green
Nigel Newport-Black
Mohamed Patel
Clive Rawlings
Suzette Davenport
Errol Thompson

Key Officials
David Neale (Chief Executive)
Matthew Boucher (Football Development Manager)
Chris Lucker (Football Services Manager)
Roger Vaughan (Referee Development and Equality Officer)

References

External links
 Gloucestershire FA's official site
 5aside football's official site

County football associations
Football in Gloucestershire
Sports organizations established in 1886